The Kulanotpes is a river in the Nura District, Karaganda Region, Kazakhstan.

It is the second most important river flowing into Lake Tengiz. There are a number of villages near its banks, including Kaynar, Kenzharak, Orazal, Kulanotpes, Kosaral, Kaskatau and Nygman. The mouth area of the Kulanotpes is part of the Korgalzhyn Nature Reserve, a protected area.

Course
The Kulanotpes river originates in the Aigyrzhal (Айғыржал) range of the Kazakh Uplands. Its source is in the northeastern slopes, near Aymysyk in the Ulytau Region. It heads roughly northwestwards, with many bends and turns. The river meanders strongly in its lower course section to the west of the Nura. In its last stretch it bends westwards and again northwards, along the western end of lake Korgalzhyn, and crossing the border of Korgalzhyn District, Akmola Region. Finally it flows into Lake Tengiz from the east near its southernmost shores.

There is a bridge crossing the river near Nygman and another further upstream. The water of the river is soft and drinkable when the river flows in the spring. In the summer and in periods of drought the flow stops and the riverbed dries along most of its length, except for scattered pools. The river is fed mainly by snow and rainwater. There are a number of lakes in its basin, such as Izendi, Karatomar, Alabaital, Tuzkol, Alabas and Zharlykol.

Flora and fauna 
The Kulanotpes is rich in fish, including pike, perch, crucian carp, carp and white bream. Reeds grow on certain stretches of the riverbank, providing a habitat for ducks and woodcocks, among other birds.

See also
List of rivers of Kazakhstan

References

External links

Kulanotpes River in Korgalzhyn reserve
The Great Silk Road in Central and Eastern Kazakhstan

Karaganda Region
Rivers of Kazakhstan
Kazakh Uplands
Tengiz basin